The Partnach Formation is a Middle Triassic geologic formation in the eastern Northern Limestone Alps and Western Carpathians, within Austria and Slovakia, Central Europe. Formation consists of alternating grey and green marls and shales (Partnach shales) and grey limestones (Partnach Limestone), often brecciated, oncolithic and containing clay intraclasts. The formation is gradually evolving from the Reifling Formation. It is usually overlain by the Lunz/Reibl Formation or Wetterstein Formation. Sediments of the Partnach Formation were deposited in intrashelf basins.

Originally defined as Partnachschichten by Wilhelm von Gümbel in 1858.

It preserves fossils dating back to the Ladinian stage of the Middle Triassic sub-period of the Triassic period.

Fossil content 
 Sauropterygia
 Lariosaurus cf. balsami
 Neusticosaurus toeplitschi
 Microleptosaurus schlosseri
 Simosaurus gaillardoti
 Temnospondyls
 Tatrasuchus sp.

See also 
 List of fossiliferous stratigraphic units in Austria

References

Further reading 
 O. Rieppel. 1996. The status of the sauropterygian reptile Partanosaurus zitteli Skuphos from the Middle Triassic of the Austrian Alps, with comments on Microleptosaurus schlosseri Skuphos. Paläontologische Zeitschrift 70(3/4):567-577
 O. Rieppel. 1993. Status of the Pachypleurosauroid Psilotrachelosaurus toeplitschi Nopcsa (Reptilia, Sauropterygia), from the Middle Triassic of Austria. Fieldiana: Geology, new series 1-17
 P. M. Sander and C. Meyer. 1991. A labyrinthodont jaw fragment from the marine Triassic of the Alps. Neues Jahrbuch für Geologie und Paläontologie, Monatshefte 1991(4):222-232

Geologic formations of Austria
Triassic System of Europe
Triassic Austria
Ladinian Stage
Limestone formations
Shallow marine deposits
Paleontology in Austria
Geology of the Alps
Northern Limestone Alps